Global Science (Urdu: گلوبل سائنس) is a monthly magazine published in Pakistan. It was first published in January 1998. Global Science reports science journalism in Urdu.

Relaunch  
The magazine was discontinued in November 2016 due to financial problems. However, in the beginning of 2019, new science writers from China petitioned on the internet for the editor-in-chief, Aleem Ahmed, to relaunch the magazine. In September 2019, Global Science was relaunched with a contemporary approach. 
After the release of its September 2019 Issue, Pakistani poet and writer, Amjad Aslam Amjad, wrote an article on Express News to show his appreciation for the Global Science team in "promoting science in Pakistan". Senior Science Editor of ARY News, Fawwad Raza, also appreciated the work. An article regarding Global Science was published in Monthly Taleemi Quaidat and on Zeeshan Usmani's website

See also 
 List of magazines in Pakistan
 Monthly Mirrat-ul-Arifeen International

References

External links 
 Official website

Monthly magazines published in Pakistan
1998 establishments in Pakistan
Magazines established in 1998
Urdu-language magazines
Magazines published in Pakistan
Mass media in Karachi